David Barr (born 8 November 1993) is an Irish cricketer. He made his List A debut for North West Warriors in the 2017 Inter-Provincial Cup on 2 July 2017. He made his first-class debut for North West Warriors in the 2017 Inter-Provincial Championship on 1 August 2017. He made his Twenty20 debut for North West Warriors in the 2017 Inter-Provincial Trophy on 11 August 2017.

References

External links
 

1993 births
Living people
Irish cricketers
North West Warriors cricketers
Place of birth missing (living people)